Smash were a Spanish psychedelic rock band formed by the sitar and guitar player Gualberto García and singer and bassist Julio Matito (1946-1979) in 1967, which was active up to 1973. Flamenco singer Manuel Molina joined the band in 1971 and they introduced flamenco elements in their last compositions pioneering the Andalusian rock.
The band reunited in 1979, but Julio Matito died in a car accident a few days later.

Discography

Studio albums
 Glorieta de los lotos, Polygram Ibérica (1970).
 We come to smash this time, Polygram Ibérica (1971).

Compilation albums 
 Vanguardia y pureza del flamenco (cara A) (1978).
 Todas sus grabaciones (1969-1978).

Singles
 Scouting / Sonetto, Diábolo (1969).
 Scouting / Ensayo nº1,  Diábolo (1970).
 I Left You / One Hopeless Whisper, Philips (1970).
 Decision / Look At The Rainbow, Philips (1970).
 Decision / I Left You, Pérgola (1970).
 Well, you know / Love Millonaire, Philips (1970).
 We come to smash this time/ My funny girl, Philips (1971).
 El garrotín / Tangos de Ketama, Bocaccio (1971).
 Ni recuerdo ni olvido (parte 1/ parte 2), Bocaccio (1971).
 Ni Recuerdo ni Olvido (parte 1/ parte 2), Chapa (1978).

References

Spanish musical groups
Musical groups established in 1967
Musical groups disestablished in 1973
1967 establishments in Spain
1973 disestablishments in Spain